A Bell nipple is a section of large diameter pipe fitted to the top of the blowout preventers that the flow line attaches to via a side outlet, to allow the drilling fluid to flow back over the shale shakers to the mud tanks.

See Drilling rig (petroleum) for a diagram.

Oilfield terminology
Drilling technology
Petroleum engineering